Arnaldo Augusto Rodrigues Pereira (born 16 June 1979) is a Portuguese futsal player who plays for Rio Ave after a short stint at GD Viso as a winger. Arnaldo is the most capped player in the history of the Portugal national futsal team with 208 appearances.

Honours
Freixieiro
Liga Portuguesa de Futsal: 2001–02

Benfica
Liga Portuguesa: 2002–03, 2004–05, 2007–08, 2008–09, 2011–12
Taça de Portugal: 2002–03, 2004–05, 2008–09, 2011–12
Supertaça de Portugal: 2003–04, 2007–08, 2009–10, 2011–12
UEFA Futsal Cup: 2009–10

Nikars
Latvian League: 2011–12, 2012–13

References

External links
 
 
 

1979 births
Living people
People from Bragança, Portugal
Portuguese men's futsal players
Xota FS players
S.L. Benfica futsal players
FK Nikars players
Instituto D. João V players
AR Freixieiro players
Baku United FC players
Sportspeople from Bragança District